The Amputee Football World Cup, or Amputee Football World Championships (from 1984 to 2003) is a world championship in amputee football.

History
It is organized by the World Amputee Football Federation (WAFF). It was first held in Seattle, USA, in 1984. The current champion is Türkiye who beat Angola in the 2022 final.

Results
Source:

Medals

See also
 Amputee football
 European Amputee Football Championship
 Asian Amputee Football Championship

References

External links
 World Amputee Football

 
Amputee football competitions
Parasports world championships
Recurring sporting events established in 1984
Quadrennial sporting events
World championships in football variants